Live Through This is a teen drama series that aired on MTV during the 2000–2001 season, though cancelled after only 13 episodes due to poor ratings. The hour-long drama plot involved a fictional 1980s band entitled "The Jackson Decker Band" reuniting for one last comeback tour. Each episode featured original music written by Graham Nash and performed by Pat Benatar. It was the first hour-long drama series to be aired on MTV.

Cast
 Matthew Carey – Travis Williams
 Tom Lock – Chase Rooney
 Sarah Manninen – Tallulah "Lu" Baker
 Jane McGregor – Darby Parsons
 Jessica Welch – Olivia Rooney
 Bruce Dinsmore – Rick Parsons
 Ron Lea – Drake Taylor
 David Nerman – Keith Rooney
 Jennifer Dale – Annie Baker

Episodes

References

External links 
 

2000s American teen drama television series
2000 American television series debuts
2001 American television series endings
MTV original programming